Aldo Albera (19 January 1923 – 15 February 2003) was an Italian sprint canoer who competed in the early 1950s. He finished 15th in the K-1 10000 m event at the 1952 Summer Olympics in Helsinki.

References
Aldo Albera's profile at Sports Reference.com
Italian Olympians ALB-ALD 

1923 births
2003 deaths
Canoeists at the 1952 Summer Olympics
Italian male canoeists
Olympic canoeists of Italy
20th-century Italian people